Norman William McGorlick (28 November 1887 – 27 July 1962) was an  Australian rules footballer who played with Geelong in the Victorian Football League (VFL).

In 1910 he emigrated to New Zealand and he served in the New Zealand military in both World War I and World War II (major in the New Zealand Home Guard).

Notes

External links 

1887 births
1962 deaths
Australian rules footballers from Victoria (Australia)
Geelong Football Club players